The Best Side of Goodbye is the fourth album by Jane Olivor, issued by Columbia Records. Joe Viglione writes in his AllMusic review that "The Best Side of Goodbye stands on its own as a valuable look at a valuable artist. It has a special power and some of its moments are quite moving."

Track listing

All track information and credits were taken from the CD liner notes.

Note: Track 9, "The Greatest Love of All", was originally recorded by (and a minor hit for) smooth jazz guitarist George Benson; it would later go on to be a smash hit for pop/soul singer Whitney Houston in 1986.

Charts

References

External links
Columbia Records Official Site

1980 albums
Jane Olivor albums
Columbia Records albums